Polonium dibromide (also known as polonium(II) bromide) is a chemical compound with the formula PoBr2. This salt is a purple-brown crystalline solid at room temperature. It sublimes (decomposing slightly) at 110 °C/30 μ and decomposes when melted in nitrogen gas at 270–280 °C.

Preparation
Polonium dibromide may be prepared by:
thermal degradation of polonium tetrabromide (PoBr4) in a vacuum at 200 °C;
dehalogenation of polonium tetrabromide by hydrogen sulfide at low temperatures (however, this does not form pure polonium dibromide, even upon heating).

Chemistry
Polonium dibromide forms purple solutions in hydrobromic acid (prepared similarly to solutions of polonium dichloride) and ketones, although the latter are rapidly oxidised to polonium(IV). Solid polonium dibromide is rapidly reduced to metallic polonium upon reaction with ammonia.

References

Polonium compounds
Bromides
Metal halides
Chalcohalides